Anne Williams-Isom (born November 17, 1964) is an American government official, academic, lawyer, and former nonprofit executive. She is the New York City deputy mayor for Health and Human Services. Williams-Isom holds the James R. Dumpson chair of child welfare studies at Fordham Graduate School of Social Service. She was the chief operating officer and later the chief executive officer of the Harlem Children's Zone.

Early life 
Williams was born on November 17, 1964, in Queens, New York City, to Edna and Atthille Williams. Williams was a student at St. Catherine of Sienna School in St. Albans, Queens. She graduated from the Dominican Commercial High School.

Williams-Isom completed a BS in political science and psychology at Fordham University in 1986. That year, she started working in community affairs at the New York City Police Department in Brooklyn. Williams-Isom earned a Juris Doctor degree at Columbia Law School in 1991. She completed course work in ministry at the New York Theological Seminary.

Career 
In 1991, Williams-Isom joined Robinson, Silverman, Pearce, Aronsohn, and Berman. She joined Kalkines, Arky, Zall & Bernstein in 1994. In 1996, Williams-Isom joined the New York City Administration for Children's Services as the director of the Office of Community Planning and Development. She later served as special counsel to the commissioner. In 2006, under during the Mayoralty of Michael Bloomberg, she was promoted to deputy commissioner of community and government affairs at the New York City Administration for Children's Services.

Williams-Isom became the chief operating officer Harlem Children's Zone in 2009. On July 1, 2014, Williams-Isom succeeded Geoffrey Canada as its chief executive officer.

Williams-Isom is the James R. Dumpson chair of child welfare studies at Fordham Graduate School of Social Service.

In December 2021, Mayor-elect Eric Adams named Williams-Isom as the incoming deputy mayor for Health and Human Services.

Personal life 
Williams-Isom is married to Phillip Isom. They have three children.

References 

Living people
1967 births
African-American people in New York (state) politics
20th-century American women lawyers
20th-century American lawyers
21st-century American women lawyers
21st-century American lawyers
African-American women lawyers
African-American lawyers
African-American women academics
American women academics
African-American academics
21st-century African-American women
20th-century African-American women
21st-century American businesswomen
21st-century American businesspeople
American nonprofit chief executives
American women chief executives
African-American business executives
African-American women in business
Lawyers from Queens, New York
Fordham University alumni
Fordham University faculty
Columbia Law School alumni
Deputy mayors of New York City
21st-century American women politicians
Women in New York (state) politics
Politicians from Queens, New York
21st-century American politicians